Mato Grosso was a  destroyer of the Brazilian Navy, serving from 1909 to 1946. She was named after the Brazilian state of Mato Grosso.

Description and Construction

In 1904 Brazil adopted an ambitious plan to renovate and modernize its Navy. The Naval Renovation Program was negotiated and enacted in December 1904 and envisioned acquisition of large number of vessels, including a dozen destroyers. In 1906 the program was modified reducing the total number of destroyers to ten. These ships became known as  destroyers.

Steam for the turbines was provided by two double-ended Yarrow boilers.

The ship mounted two  guns in single mounts. In addition, four 47 mm (3pdr) cannons in single mounts were deployed at the time of launching.

Upon completion of sea trials, Mato Grosso was officially delivered to the Brazilian government on May 5, 1909, with Captain Augusto Theotonio Pereira serving as her commander. She left Glasgow on May 31, and headed to Gourock where she loaded ammunition and departed next day for Brazil. The destroyer stopped at Falmouth, Brest, Vigo, Lisbon and Las Palmas before arriving in St. Vicente on June 27. After spending 6 days at Cabo Verde, Mato Grosso departed from St. Vicente on July 3. Her trip to Brazil lasted a little over 5 days, and the destroyer had to brave some rough seas during the last leg of her journey. The ship arrived in Recife at approximately 18:00 on July 9, 1909 and was put into a drydock for repainting and re-coaling.

References

Sources 
 Gardiner, Robert and Randal Gray, eds. Conway's All the World's Fighting Ships 1906–1921. Annapolis: Naval Institute Press, 1985. . .
 "CT Mato Grosso - CT 10." Navios De Guerra Brasileiros. Accessed 27 August 2017.
 "Mato Grosso I." Serviço de Documentação da Marinha — Histórico de Navios. Diretoria do Patrimônio Histórico e Documentação da Marinha, Departamento de História Marítima. Accessed 24 August 2017.

Pará-class destroyers (1908)
1908 ships
Ships built in Glasgow